Evangelos Tsiolis  (born 9 May 1981) is a Greek professional football midfielder who plays for Ilioupoli F.C. in the Greek Beta Ethniki.

Club career
Born in Karditsa, Tsiolis previously played in the Greek Super League with Paniliakos F.C., Panionios F.C., Kallithea F.C. and Thrasyvoulos F.C.

References

External links
Profile at Onsports.gr

1981 births
Living people
Greek footballers
Anagennisi Karditsa F.C. players
Paniliakos F.C. players
Panionios F.C. players
Kallithea F.C. players
Thrasyvoulos F.C. players
Ethnikos Asteras F.C. players
Association football midfielders
Footballers from Karditsa